Boryzops similis is a species of moth of the family Erebidae first described by Hamilton Herbert Druce in 1901. It is found in Costa Rica, Mexico, Venezuela and Brazil (Rondonia, Minas Gerais).

References

Moths described in 1901
similis
Moths of South America
Taxa named by Hamilton Herbert Druce